Under Construction (and French title as Les Lauriers-roses rouges) is a 2015 Bengali narrative feature film written and directed by Rubaiyat Hossain.

Plot
Struggling to find herself in the sprawl of urban Bangladesh, Muslim theater actress Roya suffers from her husband's wish for children and traditional life. Not interested in motherhood, she decides to reconstruct a famous and politically minded play for modern times, reclaiming her identity, her freedom and her sexuality in the process.

Cast
 Shahana Goswami
 Rikita Nandini Shimu
 Mita Rahman
 Rahul Bose
 Shahadat Hossain
 Shohel Mondol

Production
This film is produced by a Bangladeshi Film Production Company Khona Talkies.

Release
Under Construction had its premiere at the Seattle International Film Festival on 6 June 2015.

It premiered in Bangladesh on 14 January 2016 at the Dhaka International Film Festival, where it was selected as the opening film and won the Best Audience Award. It opened in cinemas in Bangladesh on 22 January and ran for 4 weeks.

Released in France on 7 June 2017 running for 6 weeks.

Festivals
 Montreal World Film Festival
 São Paulo International Film Festival
 Stockholm Film Festival
 Locarno Film Festival - Open Doors
 It was screened at 51st International Film Festival of India in January 2021 in Country in focus section.

Awards

Prix du Jury International, FICA Vesoul
Mentions spéciales de la critique, FICA Vesoul
Prix Emile Guimet, FICA Vesoul (awarded by Guimet Museum in Paris)
Best Emerging Director Award, NY AAIFF
Best Audience Award, Dhaka IFF
Bangladesh National Film Awards 2016
Best Dialogue
Best Make-up

References 

Bengali-language Bangladeshi films
2015 films
Bangladeshi drama films
2010s Bengali-language films
2015 drama films